"The Rain Don't Fall on Me" is a gospel blues song recorded in 1929 by Blind Willie Johnson (vocals and guitar) and Willie B. Harris (vocals), who is thought to have been his first wife.

Other recordings

 1963Geoff Muldaur, on the album Sleepy Man Blues
 2009Eden & John's East River String Band, on the album Drunken Barrel House Blues

References 

1929 songs
Blind Willie Johnson songs
Blues songs
Gospel songs
Songwriter unknown